Shady Grove, also known as Chesser, is an unincorporated community in Pike County, Alabama, United States.

History
Shady Grove was originally known as Chesser in honor of Jim Chesser, an early settler. The name was then changed to Shady Grove in honor of Shady Grove Methodist Church. A post office operated under the name Chesser from 1880 to 1890.

References

Unincorporated communities in Pike County, Alabama
Unincorporated communities in Alabama